Redondela is a town in the province of Pontevedra, Galicia, northwestern Spain. The most famous icons of the village are its two major railway viaducts built in the nineteenth century. Due to these infrastructures Redondela is known under the nickname "Village of the viaducts." The town lies on the Portuguese Way path of the Camino de Santiago.

The municipality has an area of 51.9 km2 (20.0 sq mi) and has a population of 29,192 in 2021.

Parroquias
 Cabeiro
 Cedeira
 Cesantes
 Chapela
 Negros
 Quintela
 Reboreda
 Redondela
 Saxamonde
 Trasmañó
 Ventosela
 Vilar de Infesta
 O Viso

Verne Monument 
The Town has a large monument to Jules Verne.

See also 
 Ignacio Ramonet
 Battle of Vigo Bay
 Mendinho
 Ernestina Otero

References

External links
Map of Redondela area, Ria de Vigo (small PNG image)
Paxina Web do Concello de Redondela, Council's Web Site
Group Folkloric O Carballo das Cen Pólas (Reboreda)

Municipalities in the Province of Pontevedra